Dyspessa is a genus of moths belonging to the family Cossidae. It was described by Jacob Hübner in 1820.

Selected species
Dyspessa aculeata Turati, 1909
Dyspessa affinis Rothschild, 1912
Dyspessa albina Rothschild, 1912
Dyspessa albosignata Rothschild, 1912
Dyspessa algeriensis (Rambur, 1858)
Dyspessa alipanahae Yakovlev, 2008
Dyspessa alpherakyi (Christoph in Romanoff, 1885)
Dyspessa aphrodite Yakovlev & Witt, 2007
Dyspessa arabeska Yakovlev, 2005
Dyspessa argaeensis Rebel, 1905
Dyspessa ariadne Yakovlev, 2008
Dyspessa artemis Yakovlev, 2008
Dyspessa aurora Yakovlev, 2008
Dyspessa blonda Yakovlev, 2008
Dyspessa cerberus Daniel, 1939
Dyspessa curta Rothschild, 1912
Dyspessa cyprica Rebel, 1927
Dyspessa cyrenaica Turati, 1916
Dyspessa daralagezi Yakovlev, 2008
Dyspessa defreinai Yakovlev, 2008
Dyspessa delrei Turati, 1936
Dyspessa dueldueli Daniel, 1939
Dyspessa elbursensis Daniel, 1964
Dyspessa elbursensis derbenti Daniel, 1964
Dyspessa emilia (Staudinger, 1878)
Dyspessa fantolii Kruger, 1934
Dyspessa fuscula (Staudinger, 1892)
Dyspessa hethitica Daniel, 1932
Dyspessa infuscata (Staudinger, 1892)
Dyspessa kabylaria Bang-Haas, 1906
Dyspessa karatavica Yakovlev, 2007
Dyspessa kostjuki Yakovlev, 2005
Dyspessa lacertula (Staudinger, 1887)
Dyspessa manas Yakovlev, 2007
Dyspessa marikowskyi Yakovlev, 2007
Dyspessa maroccana Rothschild, 1917
Dyspessa mogola Yakovlev, 2007
Dyspessa nigritula (Staudinger, 1887)
Dyspessa pallida Rothschild, 1912
Dyspessa pallidata (Staudinger, 1892)
Dyspessa psychidion (Staudinger, 1871)
Dyspessa rothschildi Yakovlev, 2011
Dyspessa ruekbeili Yakovlev, 2007
Dyspessa saldaitisi Yakovlev, 2011
Dyspessa salicicola (Eversmann, 1848)
Dyspessa serica Brandt, 1938
Dyspessa sochivkoi Yakovlev, 2008
Dyspessa stroehlei Yakovlev, 2008
Dyspessa suavis (Staudinger, 1900)
Dyspessa syrtica Kruger, 1932
Dyspessa taurica Rebel, 1905
Dyspessa thianshanica Daniel, 1964
Dyspessa tsvetaevi Yakovlev, 2008
Dyspessa turbinans Turati, 1926
Dyspessa tyumasevae Yakovlev, 2008
Dyspessa ulula (Borkhausen, 1790)
Dyspessa wagneri Schwingenschuss, 1939
Dyspessa walteri Yakovlev, 2011
Dyspessa wiltshirei Daniel, 1938
Dyspessa zurvan Yakovlev, 2008

Former species
Dyspessa foeda (Swinhoe, 1899)
Dyspessa tristis Bang-Haas, 1912

References

 , 2005: New data on distribution and systematic of Cossidae (Lepidoptera) of Europe and adjacent territories. Eversmannia 3-4: 18-27. Full article: 
 , 2007: New species of Palearctic carpenter-moths (Lepidoptera: Cossidae). Eversmannia 10(2007): 3-23. Full article: 
 , 2008: New species of Palaearctic and Oriental Cossidae (Lepidoptera). IV. New taxa of the genus Dyspessa Hübner, [1820] from South-Western Palaearctic. Eversmannia 15/16: 53-68. Full article: 
 , 2007: Dyspessa aphrodite sp. n. from Greece (Cossidae). Nota Lepidopterologica 30 (2): 411—414. Full article: .

 
Moth genera